Yana Tsikaridze (born 22 September 1987) is a Canadian rhythmic gymnast.

Tsikaridze was born in Georgia and moved to Canada at the age of ten.

Tsikaridze competed at the 2006 Commonwealth Games where she won a gold medal in the team all-around event, a silver medal in the ribbon event and bronze medals in the individual all-around and rope events.

References

1987 births
Living people
Canadian rhythmic gymnasts
Georgian emigrants to Canada
Commonwealth Games medallists in gymnastics
Commonwealth Games gold medallists for Canada
Commonwealth Games silver medallists for Canada
Commonwealth Games bronze medallists for Canada
Gymnasts at the 2006 Commonwealth Games
21st-century Canadian women
Medallists at the 2006 Commonwealth Games